This is the discography of Scottish singer-songwriter Lewis Capaldi. He achieved global mainstream success in 2019 with his breakthrough single "Someone You Loved", which charted in over 29 countries and spent seven weeks at number one on the UK Singles Chart. His debut album Divinely Uninspired to a Hellish Extent followed in May, which became the best selling album in the UK in five years, spending five weeks at number one in its first six weeks of release. The album was also certified gold in the UK only two weeks after release.

Albums

Studio albums

Live albums

Extended plays

Singles

Other charted songs

Songwriting credits

Guest appearances

Notes

References

Discographies of British artists